Araeosoma owstoni is a species of sea urchin of the family Echinothuriidae. Their armour is covered with spines. It is placed in the genus Araeosoma and lives in the sea. Araeosoma owstoni was first scientifically described in 1904 by Ole Theodor Jensen Mortensen.

See also 
 Araeosoma fenestratum
 Araeosoma leptaleum
 Araeosoma parviungulatum

References 

owstoni
Animals described in 1904
Taxa named by Ole Theodor Jensen Mortensen